The Longueuil Public Libraries Network is the public library system of Longueuil, Quebec, Canada.

Branches
There are 10 branches of the Longueul Public Libraries Network.

Bibliothèque Claude-Henri-Grignon – 1660 rue Bourassa, Le Vieux-Longueuil
Bibliothèque Fatima – 2130 rue Jean-Louis, Le Vieux-Longueuil
Bibliothèque Georges-Dor – 2760 chemin de Chambly, Le Vieux-Longueuil
Bibliothèque Hubert-Perron – 1100 rue Beauregard, Le Vieux-Longueuil
Bibliothèque Jacques-Ferron – 100 rue Saint-Laurent Ouest, Le Vieux-Longueuil
Bibliothèque Joseph-de-Sérigny – 1000 chemin du Lac, Le Vieux-Longueuil
Bibliothèque Joseph-William-Gendron – École Mgr-A.-M.-Parent 3875 Grande Allée, Saint-Hubert
Bibliothèque Raymond-Lévesque –  7025 boulevard Cousineau, Saint-Hubert
Bibliothèque Saint-Jean-Baptiste – 700 rue Duvernay, Le Vieux-Longueuil
Greenfield Park Library – 225 Empire Street, Greenfield Park

The Longueuil Public Libraries Network has a reciprocity agreement with Collège Édouard-Montpetit CEGEP, which grants library members access to Collège Édouard-Montpetit's library.

References

External links
bibliotheques.longueuil.ca 

Buildings and structures in Longueuil
Education in Longueuil
Public libraries in Quebec
Culture of Longueuil